Köln Steinstraße is a railway station situated at Porz, Cologne in western Germany on the Sieg and East Rhine Railways. It is served by the S12 line of the Rhine-Ruhr S-Bahn.  It is classified by Deutsche Bahn as a category 5 station.

Rail services 
Köln Steinstraße station is served by the S12 line of the Rhine-Ruhr S-Bahn.

Local services 
With only 400 meters (5 minutes) lies the Porz Steinstraße station served by the Cologne Stadtbahn line 7. This station consists of 2 side platforms.

References 

S12 (Rhine-Ruhr S-Bahn)
Railway stations in Cologne
Rhine-Ruhr S-Bahn stations
Cologne-Bonn Stadtbahn stations
Railway stations in Germany opened in 2003